The 2008–09 Kategoria Superiore was the 73rd season of top-tier football in Albania and the eleventh season under the name Kategoria Superiore. The season began on 24 August 2008 and ended on 23 May 2009. The defending champions were Dinamo Tirana.

KF Tirana won their 24th national league title and qualified for the UEFA Champions League; Vllaznia, Dinamo Tirana and 2008–09 Albanian Cup winners Flamurtari gained access to the UEFA Europa League. On the bottom end of the table, Lushnja and Elbasani were directly relegated. Bylis and Partizani had to face teams from the Kategoria e Parë in relegation matches. Both teams lost and thus were demoted as well.

Promotion and relegation
Besëlidhja and Skënderbeu were directly relegated to the Kategoria e Parë after finishing 11th and 12th in the previous year's standings. They were replaced by Kategoria e Parë champions Bylis and runners-up Apolonia.

9th placed Teuta and 10th placed Kastrioti had to compete in single-match relegation play-offs. Kastrioti were relegated in the process by losing on penalties against the 3rd placed team from Kategoria e Parë, Lushnja. On the other hand, Teuta saved their place in Albania's top league by beating Burreli, who had finished in 4th place in the Kategoria e Parë, with 2–1 after extra time.

Teams

Stadia and last season

League table

Results
The schedule consisted of three rounds. During the first two rounds, each team played each other once home and away for a total of 22 matches. The pairings of the third round were then set according to the standings after the first two rounds, giving every team a third game against each opponent for a total of 33 games per team.

First and second round

Third round

Relegation playoffs
Bylis as 9th-placed team (against the 4th-placed team of the Kategoria e Parë, Gramozi) and 10th-placed Partizani (against 3rd-placed Kategoria e Parë team Kastrioti) both competed in relegation play-off games after the end of the season. Superiore sides Partizani and Bylis lost their matches and were thus relegated to the Kategoria e Parë.

Top scorers
Source: soccerway.com

Notes

External links
 Official website 

Kategoria Superiore seasons
Albanian Superliga
1